"Dear Snow" is a song recorded by Japanese boy band Arashi for their tenth studio album, Beautiful World (2011). It was released as a CD single on 6 October 2010 through J Storm. "Dear Snow" was the theme song for member Kazunari Ninomiya's film Ōoku: The Inner Chambers.

"Dear Snow" reached number one on the Oricon Singles Chart for the week ending 10 October 2010 with initial sales of 501,000 copies. Within the same month of release, it was certified Double Platinum for shipments of over 500,000 units.

Single information
The single was released in two different versions: a Limited Version consisting of the A-side and a DVD with music video, and a Regular Edition containing a B-side and karaoke versions of the two songs. The music video was directed by Choku.

Track listing

Charts and certifications

Weekly charts

Year-end charts

Certifications

References

2010 singles
Arashi songs
Oricon Weekly number-one singles
Billboard Japan Hot 100 number-one singles
Japanese film songs
2010 songs